Te lo leggo negli occhi is a 1965 Italian "musicarello" film directed by Camillo Mastrocinque.

Cast 
Agnès Spaak as	Serenella
Dino	as	Dino
Nino Taranto as Gennaro
Mario Pisu as Dino's Father
Tecla Scarano as Filomena
Anna Campori as Elsa
Vittorio Congia as Fred
Giacomo Furia as Tino
Mariangela Giordano as Rita
Edy Biagetti as Valerio
Eleonora Bianchi as Dorothy
Andreina Paul
Attilio Dottesio
Gianni Dei
Valentino Macchi 
Carlo Taranto

External links
 
 Te lo leggo negli occhi at Variety Distribution

1965 films
1960s Italian-language films
Musicarelli
Films directed by Camillo Mastrocinque
1965 musical comedy films
1960s Italian films